In geometry, the orthopole of a system consisting of a triangle ABC and a line ℓ in the same plane is a point determined as follows. Let  be the feet of perpendiculars dropped on ℓ from  respectively. Then the three lines  are concurrent. The point at which they concur is the orthopole.

Due to their many properties, orthopoles have been the subject of a large literature.  
Some key topics are determination of the lines having a given orthopole and orthopolar circles.

Literature
 Orthopole=Ортополюс. In Russian

References

Points defined for a triangle